Steve Boone (born September 23, 1943) is an American bass guitarist and music producer, who is both a founding member and current member of American folk-rock group the Lovin' Spoonful. Steve co-wrote two of the groups' biggest hits, You Didn't Have to Be So Nice and Summer in the City. 

Steve has played in the Spoonful since its reformation in 1991 with founding member Joe Butler and was inducted as a member of the band into the Rock and Roll Hall of Fame in 2000 and as a member into the Vocal Group Hall of Fame in 2006.

Early life 
Steve Boone was born a Military Brat in Camp Lejeune, the Marine base where his father was serving in during the second World War, and grew up in North Carolina, St. Augustine, Florida, and in East Hampton, New York. He is the younger brother to Skip Boone, later of Autosalvage. 

His mother bought him a Gibson Acoustic Guitar as a teenager after he was involved in a serious car crash  in 1960, which left him severely injured, he stated:

While he and his brother Skip were in the Air Force, they met Joe Butler (with whom Steve later performed with in the Lovin' Spoonful). The three formed a group called the Kingsmen (not to be confused with the group of the same name known for Louie Louie). Steve was originally the group's Rhythm guitarist, but switched to Bass after their bass player moved to Louisiana.

The Lovin' Spoonful 

In the Greenwich Village section of lower Manhattan during, John Sebastian and Zal Yanovsky formed the Lovin' Spoonful. Steve first met Sebastian and Yanovsky in December 1964:

Boone and Jan Carl were invited into the group, but Carl was replaced by Joe Butler after only one gig. . The group made its first recordings for Elektra Records in early 1965 and agreed in principle to sign a long-term deal with Elektra in exchange for a $10,000 advance. However, Kama Sutra Records had an option to sign the Lovin' Spoonful as recording artists as part of a previously signed production deal, and Kama Sutra exercised the option upon learning of Elektra's intent to sign the band. 
The Lovin' Spoonful are best known for hits such as; Do You Believe in Magic, Summer in the City, Daydream, Did You Ever Have to Make Up Your Mind?, Darlin' Be Home Soon, and You Didn't Have to Be So Nice. The group's only number one was Summer In The City (which stayed there for 3 weeks in August 1966). Boone co-wrote You Didn't Have to Be So Nice (a song that has been cited as an inspiration for the composition of the 1966 song "God Only Knows" by the Beach Boys), as well as Summer in the City. Steve wrote at least one song on every Spoonful album except for the last one, Revelation: Revolution '69.

In 1980, Boone, Sebastian, Yanovsky and Butler briefly reunited to appear in the Paul Simon starring-film One-Trick Pony. In 1993 he produced the Irish Times' album, Live At McGuire's Hill 16 as well as the pop rock band Forq and their album Forq Chops in 1998.

In the early 1990s Boone teamed up with Joe Butler, Jerry Yester and Jim Yester to resume the Lovin' Spoonful's concert touring. As of 2019, Boone and Butler still tour with: Mike Aturi (Drums), Phil Smith (Guitar), and Murray Weinstock (Keyboard). 

Steve was inducted into the Rock and Roll Hall of Fame in 2000 as a member of the Lovin' Spoonful (where all the original members played together for the last time, following Yanovsky's death in 2002), and inducted as a member of the Spoonful into the Vocal Group Hall of Fame in 2006.

Steve wrote the book Hotter Than a Match Head: My Life on the Run with The Lovin’ Spoonful in 2014.

Other works 
After the Lovin' Spoonful disbanded in 1969, Boone went to work producing an album for Mercury Records by the Oxpetals. 

In 1969, Boone had started work on a solo album, but the album was scrapped shortly after.

Blue Seas Studios 
In 1973, three years after living on a sailboat, he returned to the United States to visit a friend, who was recording at ITI. While visiting ITI, Boone was asked by studio management if he’d be interested in the facility, to which Boone accepted. 

He sold his boat and moved to Baltimore, Maryland and bought ITI, which he renamed to Blue Seas Studios. His first project was recording Little Feat's Feats Don't Fail Me Now album.

Boone sold the studio some time later.

Personal life 
Sometime in 1970, Boone bought a 56 ft sailboat 'Cygnus' and moved onto it in the Virgin Islands. During his time living on the Virgin Island sailboat, Boone started secretly smuggling marijuana from the Caribbean to the United States, something he would later be arrested for.

Boone moved back to Florida in 1987, and still currently lives there. Steve is married to Lena Boone and lived on an 11 Acre farm in Southport, North Carolina. They have since also purchased a second home in Leland, North Carolina.

Boone’s older brother, Skip, later of the band Autosalvage, died in 2015.

Discography

Albums 
 Do You Believe in Magic (1965)
 Daydream (1966)
 Hums of the Lovin' Spoonful (1966)
 Everything Playing (1967)
 Revelation: Revolution '69 (1969)

Songwriting credits 
 Night Owl Blues (Co-wrote with Joe Butler, John Sebastian and Zal Yanovsky) (Do You Believe in Magic)
 You Didn't Have to Be So Nice (Co-wrote with John Sebastian) (Daydream)
 Butchie's Tune (Co-wrote with John Sebastian) (Daydream)
 Big Noise from Speonk (Co-wrote with John Sebastian and Zal Yanovsky) (Daydream)
 Full Measure (Co-wrote with John Sebastian) (Hums of the Lovin' Spoonful)
 Summer in the City (Co-wrote with John Sebastian and Zal Yanovsky) (Hums of the Lovin' Spoonful)
 Forever (One of few songs solely written by Boone) (Everything Playing)

References

External links 
Steve Boone's Website

1943 births
American rock bass guitarists
Living people
People from Baltimore
People from Onslow County, North Carolina
The Lovin' Spoonful members